KBBO-FM (92.1 FM, "Bob FM") is a commercial variety hits music radio station in Houston, Alaska, broadcasting to the Anchorage, Alaska, area.  It is owned by Ohana Media.  Its studios are located in Downtown Anchorage and its transmitter is in Eagle River, Alaska.

References

External links
Bob-FM's website

Ohana Broadcast Company, LLC stations
BBO-FM
Adult hits radio stations in the United States
Bob FM stations
Radio stations established in 1997
1997 establishments in Alaska